Shilton Alessanco dos Santos is a Brazilian professional basketball player, who currently plays for Flamengo.  He is a small but very strong center, very skilled at getting rebounds, both offensive and defensive. Shilton is also known for his powerful post moves, most of the time successfully drawing a foul. Although not a good free throw shooter ( a little below 50% for the 09-10 season), Shilton scores some crucial points at the foul line on the very competitive games in NBB, Brazilian premier league.

Previous teams
As of early 2010, Shilton has played for the following teams:
Círculo Militar - SP
Monte Líbano - SP
Pinheiros - SP
Londrina - PR
Campos - RJ
Araldite/Univille Joinville - SC

Araldite/Univille - Joinville
Shilton has been playing in Joinville since 2005, and is now the team captain. He is very loved by the team's supporters, as he has been on the team longer than any other player on the current squad. In the 2009-2010 season of NBB, Shilton, the starting center for Joinville has scored 209 points in 23 games. He had a great importance on the team's playoffs run in the 08'-09' season, finishing 4th overall with a 0.750 record for the season.

Stats at Joinville

Regular season

|-
| style="text-align:left;"| 2008–2009
| style="text-align:left;"| Joinville
| 30 || 30 || 35.4 || .584 || .000 || .583 || 11.9 || 2.7 || N/A || 0.7 || 12.4
|-
| style="text-align:left;"| 2009–2010
| style="text-align:left;"| Joinville
| 25 || 25 || 28.4 || .486 || .000 || .441 || 7.7 || 1.76 || 0.84 || 0.36 || 8.8
|-
| style="text-align:left;"| 2010–2011
| style="text-align:left;"| Joinville
| 26 || 26 || 27.4 || N/A || .000 || N/A || 7.8 || 1.8 || 0.6 || 0.2 || 8.5
|-
| style="text-align:left;"| 2011–2012
| style="text-align:left;"| Joinville
| 28 || 28 || 27.2 || N/A || .000 || .605 || 7.0 || 1.0 || 0.9 || 0.2 || 10.6

Playoffs

|-
| style="text-align:left;"| 
| style="text-align:left;"| Joinville
| 7 || 7 || 36.7 || .461 || .000 || .571 || 12.4 || 4.1 || N/A || 0.7 || 11.9
|-
| style="text-align:left;"| 
| style="text-align:left;"| Joinville
| 6 || 6 || 0 || .000 || .000 || .000 || 0 || 0 || 0 || 0 || 8.3

References
http://www.basquetedejoinville.com.br
http://www.lnb.com.br

External links
LatinBasket.com Profile

1982 births
Living people
Brazilian men's basketball players
Centers (basketball)
Esporte Clube Pinheiros basketball players
Flamengo basketball players
Minas Tênis Clube basketball players
Associação Bauru Basketball players
Sport Club Corinthians Paulista basketball players
Novo Basquete Brasil players
People from Cuiabá
Sportspeople from Mato Grosso